The Direction générale des études et recherches (English: General Directorate for Studies and Research, DGER), was a division of the Bureau Central de Renseignements et d'Action (BCRA), the intelligence agency of the Free French Forces, Charles de Gaulle's French government-in-exile in London. It was created in 1944, and Jacques Soustelle was the first director, from 6 November 1944 to 18 April 1945, followed by André Dewavrin until April 1946, when the DGER became the Service de documentation extérieure et de contre-espionnage (SDECE).

Defunct French intelligence agencies
Military history of France